The Medford Dodgers were a minor league baseball team based in Medford, Oregon, that played in the Class A-Short Season Northwest League from 1969-1971. Prior to 1970, the club played as the Rouge Valley Dodgers.

History
Rogue Vally Baseball, Inc. was awarded a Northwest League franchise to play in Medford. The club affiliated with the San Francisco Giants. Utilizing their parent club's namesake, the Medford Giants played for two season from 1967-1968. The club changed affiliations to the Los Angeles Dodgers in 1969 and became the Rogue Valley Dodgers for a season. In late July 1969 the franchise was sold to Ashland businessman Cleatis Mitchell. The Dodgers finished the season with a record of 50-29 to claim the Northwest League championship. Following the season the Rouge Valley name was dropped in favor of Medford. Half way into the 1971 season the club was in financial trouble. Owner Cleatis Mitchell sought financial assistance for the Los Angeles Dodgers in the amount of $6000. Without additional funding the club would cease operations. The Dodgers received the necessary funding played in Medford through the 1971 season. 

The Dodgers moved their Northwest League affiliate to Spokane in 1972, which had been their AAA team in the Pacific Coast League since 1958, when they moved from Brooklyn to Los Angeles. 

Spokane returned to the Pacific Coast League in 1973 as the Texas Rangers affiliate and the Dodgers moved their Northwest League affiliation west to Bellingham.

The Northwest League returned to Medford and Miles Field in 1979 when the Bend Timber Hawks moved south after one season in central Oregon and became the Medford A's.

Season-by-season record

References

External links
Stats Crew Medford Dodgers

Defunct Northwest League teams
Defunct minor league baseball teams
Los Angeles Dodgers minor league affiliates
Sports in Medford, Oregon
Defunct baseball teams in Oregon
1967 establishments in Oregon
1971 disestablishments in Oregon
Professional baseball teams in Oregon
Baseball teams disestablished in 1971
Baseball teams established in 1967